Sir Robert Pigot, 6th Baronet  (3 May 1882 – 27 December 1977) was a British Army and later Royal Air Force officer who served in both world wars.

Early life
He was the son of Sir George Pigot, 5th Baronet and his wife Alice, daughter of Sir James Thompson Mackenzie, 1st Baronet. He became the sixth Baronet on the death of his father in 1934.

Military service
He served with the Rifle Brigade until he joined the Royal Flying Corps as adjutant from 1913-14. He was awarded the Distinguished Service Order (DSO) and Military Cross (MC) in the First World War.

In the second world war he served with the RAF Volunteer Reserve, resigning his commission as a wing commander in 1944.

Family life
Pigot married in 1913 to Norah Hargraves and they had three daughters. He died on 27 December 1977 at Yeovil in Somerset.

References 

1882 births
1977 deaths
Baronets in the Baronetage of Great Britain
Companions of the Distinguished Service Order
Recipients of the Military Cross
Royal Air Force wing commanders
Rifle Brigade officers
British Army personnel of World War I
Royal Flying Corps officers
Royal Air Force Volunteer Reserve personnel of World War II